Princess Tinkerbell Cristina Marjorie Pedere Snell (born 14 April 1992), later known by her stage name Nathalie Hart, is an Australian-Filipino actress who was one of the finalists in the fifth season of StarStruck.

Career
Before auditioning for StarStruck, Snell was part of ABS-CBN’s Star Magic.  She was among the new actors launched as Star Magic Batch 16 in 2008.

In 2009, Snell auditioned for the fifth season of StarStruck and qualified show's final 14. She was eliminated along with Piero Vergara during the double eliminations in StarStruck'''s 5th week. She later signed an exclusive contract with GMA Artist Center and GMA Network.

In 2015, she went on a television hiatus after her last teleserye, Second Chances.

In 2018, she made a return on ABS-CBN via The Blood Sisters, which is also her comeback tv acting project.

Hart is featured on the cover of FHM Philippines''' May 2018 issue, which is the magazine's final print edition.

Personal life
On February 2019, she gave birth to her daughter, Penelope, in Sydney, Australia. Later on, Hart finally confirmed that she had called it quits with the father of her daughter, Indian businessman Mayank Sharma.

Filmography

Television

Film

Awards and nominations

Notes

References

External links
Nathalie Hart at GMANetwork.com

1992 births
Living people
Actresses from Laguna (province)
Filipino child actresses
Filipino film actresses
Filipino people of Australian descent
Filipino television actresses
People from San Pedro, Laguna
Tagalog people
Star Magic
ABS-CBN personalities
Participants in Philippine reality television series
StarStruck (Philippine TV series) participants
Survivor Philippines contestants
GMA Network personalities
Viva Artists Agency